The Joy of Christmas is a Christmas album featuring the Mormon Tabernacle Choir, along with the New York Philharmonic conducted by Leonard Bernstein. Richard P. Condie directed the choir.

Originally released by Columbia Masterworks in October 1963, the 50+ minutes album, unusually long for its time for one LP, was released on compact disc on July 7, 1990 by Sony Masterworks.  The album was reissued in 1997 with additional selections by Bernstein and the Philharmonic, including music from Tchaikovsky's The Nutcracker Suite. 

On October 23, 1979 the album was RIAA certified as a Gold album.

Album information

Track listing

Charts

References

1963 Christmas albums
Christmas albums by American artists
Classical Christmas albums
Columbia Records Christmas albums
Tabernacle Choir albums
New York Philharmonic albums